This is a historical timeline of Portugal.

Third Dynasty: Habsburg (Spanish rule)

16th century
1580
Invasion of Portugal by a Spanish army commanded by Fernando Álvarez de Toledo, Duke of Alba.
Battle of Alcântara between Portuguese and Spanish forces.
The Fortress of St. Julian, in Lisbon, surrenders to the Spanish.
Anthony of Portugal, the Prior of Crato, is acclaimed King of Portugal in Santarém.
Death of Luís de Camões, Portugal's national poet.
Beginning of the Cortes (General Assembly of the Kingdom) of Tomar.
1581
Philip II of Spain is acclaimed in the Cortes of Tomar as King Philip I of Portugal in a personal union of the Crowns. Portugal loses de facto independence to Spain.
Anthony of Portugal, the Prior of Crato, takes refuge in England.
The Azores refuse to recognize Philip I of Portugal as King.
1582
The Spanish Fleet of Santa Cruz defeats the Portuguese-French Fleet of Strozzi in the Azores.
Introduction of the Gregorian Calendar in Portugal.
1583
Cortes in Lisbon.
King Philip I of Portugal departs for Madrid and leaves the government of Portugal with Portuguese trustees.
The Azores are submitted.
Francis Drake attacks Portuguese Brazil.
1589 – Anthony of Portugal, the Prior of Crato, attacks Lisbon with English aid, but with no success.
1595 – Anthony of Portugal, the Prior of Crato, dies in Paris.
1598 – Philip III of Spain becomes Philip II of Portugal.

17th century
1621 – Philip IV of Spain becomes Philip III of Portugal.

See also
Timeline of Portuguese history
Second Dynasty: Aviz (14th to 16th century)
Fourth Dynasty: Bragança (17th to 20th century)

Third Dynasty
Kingdom of Portugal
Modern history of Portugal

de:Zeittafel Portugal
ru:Португалия: Даты Истории